Packing for Mars: The Curious Science of Life in the Void is a nonfiction work by science author Mary Roach.

Published in August 2010, Packing for Mars was recognized in "Amazon's Best Books" of that month, it quickly became a #6 New York Times bestseller, and it was chosen as the book of the year for the 7th annual One City One Book: San Francisco Reads literary event program.

In Packing for Mars, Roach searches for answers to questions about the gross, the bizarre, and the uncomfortable aspects of space travel. The book's sixteen chapters cover the entire comedic spectrum of all things space-related and also include some study of the scientific side of space travel. The chapters discussing the various bodily functions of astronauts in space (going to the bathroom, having sex, vomiting) and obscure testing procedures (animals in space, lying in beds for months, parabolic zero-g) are balanced by the informative sections on topics such as the psychological effects of being in space, astronaut training, and the increasing use of human cadavers over crash test dummies in research.

Mary Roach's overview
Mary Roach, the author of Packing for Mars, was raised in Etna, New Hampshire and spent several years working as a freelance copy editor and investigating unpopular topics. Roach explores many questions such as what happens after we die, what sex is all about, and what secrets human cadavers hold. However, in Packing for Mars, she turns her mind toward space and examines the logistics of space travel. In an interview, she describes her book to be about all the surreal physical and physiological challenges of living in space as a human being. Roach explains that in addition to these problems, human beings are not in the slightest equipped or prepared to confront these challenges. Although most of her other books have one-word titles, Mary Roach claims that it was especially difficult to come up with a one-word title for this specific book.

Subjects covered
The book covers 12 topics:

 The psychological specifications for being considered for a space mission
 The psychological effects of being in space
 Initial precautions of going to space
 Testing procedures
 Cadavers used for anatomically precise testing
 Animal testing
 Simulation procedures
 Space hygiene
 The physiological effects of being in space
 Sex in Space
 Preparing food for space
 The author's thoughts on space travel

Reviews

References

External links 
 Mary Roach's website
 Packing for Mars on W. W. Norton & Company's website

2010 non-fiction books
Human spaceflight
Popular science books
Spaceflight books
W. W. Norton & Company books